Hoover Dam is a dam on the Colorado River bordering Nevada and Arizona, US.

Hoover Dam or Hooverdam may also refer to:

 Hoover Dam (Ohio), a dam near Westerville, Ohio, US
 "Hoover Dam", a song from the album Copper Blue by Sugar
 Hooverdam (album), by Hugh Cornwell

See also
 Hoover Dam Police, the Colorado River dam's police force
 Hoover Dam Bypass or Mike O'Callaghan – Pat Tillman Memorial Bridge, a bridge crossing the Colorado downstream of Hoover Dam
 Hoover Dam in popular culture
 Boulder Dam (disambiguation)